There are many large stones of Scotland of cultural and historical interest, notably the distinctive Pictish stones, but also the other types discussed below.

Stone of Scone
The Stone of Scone, (pronounced 'scoon') also commonly known as the "Stone of Destiny" or the "Coronation Stone", is a block of sandstone historically kept at the now-ruined abbey in Scone, near Perth, Scotland. It was used for centuries in the coronation of the monarchs of Scotland, the monarchs of England, and, more recently, British monarchs.

Rocking stones
Ayrshire apparently is endowed with a geology that lends itself towards the formation of rocking stones. There are several rocking stones, or stones that used to rock at one time, in Ayrshire, Scotland.

A rocking stone is recorded from near the site of Saint Bride's Chapel. This stone stands on top of the Craigs of Kyle near Coylton in Ayrshire. It weighs around 30 tons and rest upon two stones. A large standing stone known as Wallace's stone stands nearby.

There is a rocking stone near Loch Riecawr in South Ayrshire.

In the parish of North Carrick in the Straiton District in South Ayrshire, 
about a quarter of a mile to the west of the White Laise, and near the March Dyke, there is a rocking stone named the Logan Stone. The Logan Stone is a grey granite rock and rests on greywacke, and can easily be moved with one hand. It is 4 feet 3 inches by 4 feet, by 3 feet high.

A rocking stone that some associate with the Druids is on Cuff Hill in Hessilhead, near Beith in North Ayrshire. It no longer rocks due to people digging beneath to ascertain its fulcrum. It is in a small wood and surrounded by a circular drystone wall. An article was published in Cumnock Chronicle of 1907 on the reason for the stone being dislodged. Signed by a Messer's Robert Boyle & Robert Currie.

The Lamagee or Lamargle stone is in the centre of a stone circle in the village of Lugar in East Ayrshire. The Lamargle stone rests on two stones. Local legend has it that the Lamargle stone used to rock, but it no longer does.

 

Near Lugar in the Parish of Auchinleck in Ayrshire, Scotland is a rocking stone in a hollow by the Bella Water near its junction with the Glenmore Water. It is made of two vertical stones, and a horizontal stone about six feet long, three feet broad and four feet high. It was regarded as a Druidical monument or the grave of a Caledonian hero.

A rocking stone existed in 1913 – 1919 at Sannox on Arran. It sat on a nearly horizontal platform next to the seashore.

The Clochoderick stone near Howwood and Kilbarchan in Renfrewshire used to rock and it is said that the Druids used it to judge people. The accused was made to sit on the stone and by the way it moved the Druids judged the innocence or guilt of the individual. It is also said to be the burial place of Rhydderch Hael, King of Strathclyde who was the victor at the Battle of Arderydd near Arthuret in the Borders. His victory brought Christianity to Strathclyde.

Views of the Cuff Hill rocking stone
This stone could still, with a little effort, be rocked in the 1860s according to the historian John Smith.

Lochmaben stone
The megalith known as the Lochmaben Stone was called the Lochmabonstone in a well-known book by Logan Mack in 1926. This stone has, in the Borders context, an unsurpassed extent of history attached to it. It stands in a field, nearly a mile west of the Sark mouth on the Solway Firth, three hundred yards or so above high-water mark on the farm of Old Graitney in Dumfries & Galloway, Scotland. Map reference: NY 3123 6600. The area is also known as Stormont.

The stone is an erratic, 7' high and 18' in girth and weighs approximately ten tons. It is composed of weathered granite, exposed to severe glacial action.

Thurgartstone

The Ogrestone or Thurgartstone near Dunlop in East Ayrshire is thought to have been a rocking stone. However, soil has built up around the base of the Thurgatstone over the years, which now prevents any rocking motion.

The Thurgatstane / Thorgatstane / Field Spirit Stane / Ogrestane near Dunlop in East Ayrshire is a glacial erratic stone near the middle of a field belonging to Brandleside Farm near to the site of St.Mary's Chapel on the Lugton road.

Views of the Thurgartstone in 2007

The Carlin or Hag's Stone

On top of the Common Crags overlooking Dunlop and the Glazert is a large procumbent boulder known as the 'Carlin's Stone or Stane'. This stone is not as well known as the Thorgatstane. A Carl is a commoner, a husband or in a derogatory sense, a churl or person of low birth. Carlin is the Scots equivalent of Gaelic "Cailleach", meaning a witch or the 'old Hag', goddess of Winter. This would therefore be the Witch's Stone, one of several in Scotland with this name.

Near 'Kirkhill' outside Stewarton are several Kilbrides. Bride, Brigit or St. Brigid was originally a Celtic Goddess linked with the festival of Imbolc, the eve of the first of February. She was the goddess of Spring and was associated with healing and sacred wells, therefore the antithesis of the Carlin. Carlin's Tooth is the name of a rock outcrop in the Scottish borders between Knocks Knowe and Carter Fell (Logan Mack 1926). Several Carling Farms are to be found near Darvel in Ayrshire.

The Stone of Mannau 

Clackmannan (from the Gaelic Clach Mhanainn, 'Stone of Manau') is the name of a small town and local government district in the Central region of Scotland, corresponding to the traditional county of Clackmannanshire, which was Scotland's smallest. The 'Stone of Manau or Manaw' is a monolith of religious significance to the ancient tribes of the area. It has been moved from its original position and placed in the town centre on top of a large standing stone, which was quarried locally.

The Dagon Stone
The RCHAMS 'Canmore' site lists this unhewn olivine monolith in Darvel, Ayrshire, as a 'possible' standing stone. It is rather curious and its general size and shape suggest a prehistoric standing stone. It has twelve small connected depressions spread over three of its sides. These have been said to link the stone to astronomical observations and to the noon-day sun height at mid-summer. This would link the stone to life-giving powers, fertility and prosperity.

In 1821 someone attached a round sandstone ball to the top of it with an iron bar. Who or why is unknown. It is 1.6m tall and its original position is also unknown. It used to stand in what is now the main street, at the end of Ranoldcoup Road as shown by an old photograph, and was moved to the town square when the road was widened.

Documentation shows that prior to the 19th century messings-about, newlywed couples and their wedding parties marched around it for good luck, accompanied by a fiddler. Wedding processions also used to walk three times sunwise round the Dagon stone on the way to the bride's house.

The annual parade or "Prawd", originally held on old New Year's Day, headed by the village band used to walk sunwise round the Dagon stone as a mark of superstitious respect.

Dagon is the name of a Philistine god, who was half-man half-fish. But with a Scottish accent it no doubt derives from something much closer to home (assuming it is not just the romantic invention of a Victorian antiquary). It is reminiscent of the Clackmannan stone or Stone of Mannau in Clackmannanshire.

The Dooslan stone 

This glacial erratic stone now lies in Brodie Park in Paisley. It is thought to have been named after a Mr Dove who laid claim to the stone. Originally to be found at the corner of Neilston Road and Rowan Street in Paisley, the stone was the meeting place of the Weavers Union in the South of Paisley and was also used as a "soapbox". It was later moved to its present location in Brodie Park. The stone is still used today as the meeting point for the annual Sma' Shots parade. Its ancient significance is unknown, but it has played a significant role in historical times and has probably always been a megalith of social significance.

Some views of Stones of Scotland

The Carlin Stone at Craigends

A large procumbent boulder known on the OS map as the 'Carlin's Stone' lies next to the Carlin Burn near Craigends Farm below Cameron's Moss in East Ayrshire. The name is the same as the example at Dunlop in East Ayrshire. It has been much visited at one time, with the clear remains of a footbridge running to it across the Hareshawmuir Water.

The Deil's Chuckie Stane at Ladyland

A large boulder in amongst trees near the David Hamilton designed Ladyland House, Kilbirnie, North Ayrshire. Despite the name no clear legend has been preserved regarding this stone in the neighbourhood. The stone has survived being broken up despite the building of the old Ladyland Castle, stone dykes, farm buildings, etc.

The Grannie stane at Irvine in Ayrshire

The Grannie Stane (or Granny Stane) is described as "one of Irvine's prehistoric puzzles", this boulder is either left behind from the Ice Age or is the last remaining stone of a stone circle – others were removed, by blasting, after the Irvine weir was constructed in 1895, but popular protests saved this remaining stone. The Grannie Stane is visible when the water is low.

The Hare stone

The Muckle or Hare stone is a glacial erratic boulder previously located in a nearby field and moved to the centre of Monkton, near Prestwick, in 2000. A number of tales of witchcraft and evil spirits are associated with it.

The Gowk Stane

Near Laigh Overmuir on the moors above Darvel in East Ayrshire is the Gowk Stane, a glacial erratic boulder located in a prominent position overlooking the upper tributaries of the Glen Water.

The Haylie Chambered Tomb

In Largs, North Ayrshire resides a neolithic tomb behind Douglas Park. This monument is known as the Haylie Chambered Tomb and it was once covered by a cairn of stones (known as Margaret's Law). When it was uncovered in the early twentieth century the tomb was dated to around 3000 to 2000 BC.

Cup and ring mark stone
The purpose of cup and ring marked stones is unknown, however they may represent family trees, star maps, br related to labyrinths, etc. The carvings on such stones date from the Neolithic or Bronze Age times, being as old as 6000 years. This example from Dalgarven Mill in Ayrshire is unusual in having cups and connecting troughs, but no rings and it may therefore have been abandoned at an early stage in its use. Often up to five concentric rings are found circling the central cup.

Scottish Standing Stones

Stone Arrangements

There are several stone circles (and other arrangements such as the Celtic Cross formation of the Callanish Stones) in Scotland.
 Calanais (Callanish I)
 Callanish II
 Callanish III
 Callanish IV
 Callanish VIII
 Callanish X
 Cullerlie stone circle
 Dunnideer stone circle
 Easter Aquhorthies
 Loanhead of Daviot stone circle
 Ring of Brodgar
 Sunhoney
 Temple Wood
 The Ringing Stone
 Rothiemay Stone Circle

Scottish standing stones

There are several well-known lone standing stones in Scotland.
 Achavanich
 Ballymeanoch
 Clach an Trushal
 Comet Stone
 Hill o'Many Stanes
 Nether Largie
 Stones of Stenness
 Watch Stone
 Maiden Stone
 Yarrow Stone, Selkirk
 Dunfallandy Stone
 Picardy Stone

Scottish picture stones
There are a number of famous Picture stones with carvings on them in Scotland.
 The Goose Stone
 Tillytarmont
 Red Hill Stone
 Aberlemmo Territorial Stone

Scottish recumbent stones
 Easter Aquhorthies Recumbent Stone Circle
 Korskellie Recumbent Stone
 Avochie Recumbent Stone
 The Wolf Stone, Brora, East Sutherland
 Brandsbutt Stone
 Carlin stone, Dunlop, East Ayrshire

See also
 Thurgartstone
 Corsehill
 Rocking Stones
 Corsehill, Lainshaw, Robertland and Dunlop

References 

 MacIntosh, John (1894). Ayrshire Nights Entertainments: A Descriptive Guide to the History, traditions, Antiquities, etc. of the County of Ayr. Pub. Kilmarnock. p. 195.
 Mack, James Logan (1926). The Border Line. Pub. Oliver & Boyd.
 Dark Isle webpage list of Scottish stone circles
 A list of some Scottish stone circles
 A list of Scottish recumbent stone circles
 Scottish stone monuments
 A guidebook to stone observatories in Scotland

External links 
 Ayrshire's ancient stones
 Thurgatstane Photo
 Video and commentary on the Thurgartstone
 Video of Scottish Glacial Erratics in History, Myth & Legend

Archaeological sites in Scotland
Buildings and structures in Scotland
Megalithic monuments in Scotland
Stones
Landforms of Scotland